Agaedioxenis is a genus of parasitic flies in the family Tachinidae.

Species
Agaedioxenis brevicornis (Villeneuve, 1939)
Agaedioxenis kirkspriggsi Cerretti, O’Hara & Stireman, 2015
Agaedioxenis setifrons (Villeneuve, 1937)
Agaedioxenis succulentus Cerretti, O’Hara & Stireman, 2015
Agaedioxenis timidus Cerretti, O’Hara & Stireman, 2015

References

Exoristinae
Tachinidae genera
Diptera of Africa
Taxa named by Joseph Villeneuve de Janti